Quantum capacitance, also called chemical capacitance and electrochemical capacitance , is a quantity first introduced by Serge Luryi (1988), and is defined as the variation of electrical charge  with respect to the variation of electrochemical potential , i.e., .

In the simplest example, if you make a parallel-plate capacitor where one or both of the plates has a low density of states, then the capacitance is not given by the normal formula for parallel-plate capacitors, . Instead, the capacitance is lower, as if there was another capacitor in series, . The equivalent capacitance is called electrochemical capacitance .

Quantum capacitance is especially important for low-density-of-states systems, such as a 2-dimensional electronic system in a semiconductor surface or interface or graphene, and can be used to construct an experimental energy functional of electron density.

Overview 

When a voltmeter is used to measure an electronic device, it does not quite measure the pure electric potential (also called Galvani potential). Instead, it measures the electrochemical potential, also called "fermi level difference", which is the total free energy difference per electron, including not only its electric potential energy but also all other forces and influences on the electron (such as the kinetic energy in its wavefunction). For example, a p-n junction in equilibrium, there is a galvani potential (built-in potential) across the junction, but the "voltage" across it is zero (in the sense that a voltmeter would measure zero voltage).

In a capacitor, there is a relation between charge and voltage, . As explained above, we can divide the voltage into two pieces: The galvani potential, and everything else.

In a traditional metal-insulator-metal capacitor, the galvani potential is the only relevant contribution. Therefore, the capacitance can be calculated in a straightforward way using Gauss's law.

However, if one or both of the capacitor plates is a semiconductor, then galvani potential is not necessarily the only important contribution to capacitance. As the capacitor charge increases, the negative plate fills up with electrons, which occupy higher-energy states in the band structure, while the positive plate loses electrons, leaving behind electrons with lower-energy states in the band structure. Therefore, as the capacitor charges or discharges, the voltage changes at a different rate than the galvani potential difference.

In these situations, one cannot calculate capacitance merely by looking at the overall geometry and using Gauss's law. One must also take into account the band-filling / band-emptying effect, related to the density-of-states of the plates. The band-filling / band-emptying effect alters the capacitance, imitating a second capacitance in series. This capacitance is called quantum capacitance, because it is related to the energy of an electron's quantum wavefunction.

Some scientists refer to this same concept as chemical capacitance, because it is related to the electrons' chemical potential.

The ideas behind quantum capacitance are closely linked to Thomas–Fermi screening and band bending.

Theory 
Take a capacitor where one side is a metal with essentially-infinite density of states. The other side is the low density-of-states material, e.g. a 2DEG, with density of states .

Now suppose that N electrons (a charge of ) are moved from the metal to the low-density-of-states material.

The total voltage change is the sum of these two contributions. Therefore, the total effect is as if there are two capacitances in series: The conventional geometry-related capacitance (as calculated by Gauss's law), and the "quantum capacitance" related to the density of states. The latter is:

In the case of an ordinary 2DEG with parabolic dispersion,

where  is the valley degeneracy factor, and m* is effective mass.

Applications

The quantum capacitance of graphene is relevant to understanding and modeling gated graphene. It is also relevant for carbon nanotubes.

In modeling and analyzing dye-sensitized solar cells, the quantum capacitance of the sintered TiO2 nanoparticle electrode is an important effect, as described in the work of Juan Bisquert.

Luryi proposed a variety of devices using 2DEGs, which only work because of the low 2DEG density-of-states, and its associated quantum capacitance effect. For example, in the three-plate configuration metal-insulator-2DEG-insulator-metal, the quantum capacitance effect means that the two capacitors interact with each other.

Quantum capacitance can be relevant in capacitance–voltage profiling.

When supercapacitors are analyzed in detail, quantum capacitance plays an important role.

References

External links
D.L. John, L.C. Castro, and D.L. Pulfrey "Quantum Capacitance in Nanoscale Device Modeling" Nano Electronics Group Publications.
ECE 453 Lecture 30: Quantum Capacitance

Quantum models
Capacitance